The 1991–92 season was Atlético Madrid's 61st season since foundation in 1903 and the club's 57th season in La Liga, the top league of Spanish football. Atlético competed in La Liga, the Supercopa de España, the Copa del Rey, and the European Cup Winners' Cup.

Summary 
The club reached a decent 3rd place in League and clinched the Copa del Rey defeating archrivals Real Madrid in the Final.

Squad

Transfers

Winter

Competitions

La Liga

League table

Results by round

Matches

Copa del Rey

Eightfinals

Quarterfinals

Semifinals

Final

European Cup Winners' Cup

Second round

Eightfinals

Quarterfinals

Supercopa

Copa Iberica

Statistics

Squad statistics

Players statistics

References

External links 
 Schedule of Atletico Madrid in 1991–1992 season.
 Matches of Atletico Madrid in 1991–1992 season.

Atlético Madrid seasons
Atlético Madrid